Jigneshkumar Sevak is an Indian politician. He was elected to the Gujarat Legislative Assembly from Lunawada in the 2019 by election as a member of the Bharatiya Janata Party. By-elections happen due to Ratansinh Rathod elected to Parliament.

References

Living people
Bharatiya Janata Party politicians from Gujarat
People from Mahisagar district
Gujarat MLAs 2017–2022
Year of birth missing (living people)